Machacamarca is a small town in the Pantaléon Dalence Province in the Oruro Department in Bolivia. It is the seat of the Machacamarca Municipality and of the Machacamarca Canton. At the time of census 2001 it had a population of 2,206. The town is situated south of Oruro near the south-eastern shore of Lake Uru Uru at the road and railway that lead to Poopó.

The people in the Machacamarca Municipality are mainly Quechua (80.7%).

Places of interest 
Some of the tourist attractions of Machacamarca are the railway museum, the church in  the colonial village of Sora Sora, hot springs, chullpas and ruins.

See also 
 Wila Ch'ankha

References

External links 
 Machacamarca Municipality: population data and map

Populated places in Oruro Department